These are the official results of the Men's Pole Vault event at the 1983 IAAF World Championships in Helsinki, Finland. There were a total number of 27 participating athletes. The qualification round was stopped and later canceled due to heavy rain and strong winds and eventually a straight final was held on 14 August, the last day of the championships.

Medalists

Records

Results

Final

See also
 1980 Men's Olympic Pole Vault (Moscow)
 1982 Men's European Championships Pole Vault (Athens)
 1984 Men's Olympic Pole Vault (Los Angeles)
 1984 Men's Friendship Games Pole Vault (Moscow)
 1986 Men's European Championships Pole Vault (Stuttgart)
 1987 Men's World Championships Pole Vault (Rome)
 1988 Men's Olympic Pole Vault (Seoul)

References
 Results

P
Pole vault at the World Athletics Championships